Carlos Ruiz Herrero (born 7 June 1948), known simply as Carlos, is a Spanish retired footballer who played as a forward.

He spent 11 seasons in La Liga with Athletic Bilbao, appearing in 275 competitive games and scoring 115 goals.

Club career
Born in Bilbao, Biscay, the third of ten sons in a large family, Carlos played for eleven seasons with Athletic Bilbao, plus one with the reserves, having been signed in 1969 from Basque neighbours CD Getxo. On 12 September 1970 he made his debut for the first team, playing the dying minutes of the 1–1 home draw against FC Barcelona.

In the following years, Carlos continued to be used regularly by the club, although he was not always an undisputed starter. In the 1974–75 season, however, he scored a career-best 19 goals in 32 games (winning the Pichichi Trophy in the process), for a tenth place in La Liga; on 18 May 1977 he netted the goal to put his side 2–1 up at home against Juventus FC in the campaign's final of the UEFA Cup – his last of five during their continental run – but the Italians won the trophy on the away goals rule.

Carlos still enjoyed two seasons in double digits until he left Athletic, including 1977–78 with 16 goals, but also had to deal with several injuries. He retired from the game in the summer of 1982 at the age of 34 after a spell with RCD Español, amassing top flight totals of 234 matches and 83 goals.

International career
Carlos was never capped by Spain at senior level, but did play for the under-21 side once, in a match against Yugoslavia played in Elche, at the Estadio Manuel Martínez Valero.

Later life
Having studied medicine at the University of Bilbao at Leioa (now part of the University of the Basque Country during his playing career, Ruiz subsequently went into practice as a doctor specialising in the treatment of athletes. He performed roles assisting various sports teams, including basketball club CB Cajabilbao and the Spanish national squads in handball and women's football.

In 2011, Ruiz was part of the team behind the unsuccessful campaign of Fernando García Macua to be re-elected as club president of Athletic Bilbao.

Honours
Athletic Bilbao
Copa del Generalísimo: 1972–73; runner-up 1976–77
UEFA Cup: runner-up 1976–77

Individual
La Liga: Top scorer 1974–75

References

External links

Athletic Club Profile

1948 births
Living people
Footballers from Getxo
Footballers from Bilbao
Spanish footballers
Association football forwards
La Liga players
Segunda División players
CD Getxo players
Bilbao Athletic footballers
Athletic Bilbao footballers
RCD Espanyol footballers
Spain under-21 international footballers
Pichichi Trophy winners
University of the Basque Country alumni
20th-century Spanish physicians
21st-century Spanish physicians